The 2020–21 LPB season is the 88th season of the premier Portuguese basketball league and the 13th season under the current Liga Portuguesa de Basquetebol (LPB) format. For sponsorship reasons, the league was also known as Liga Placard.

Teams
Imortal and Academica Efapel are promoted to Liga Placard, replacing Illiabum and Terceira.

Regular season

League table

Results

Playoffs

Playouts

Portuguese clubs in European competitions

References

External links
FPB Liga Placard website

Liga Portuguesa de Basquetebol seasons
Portuguese